Walter Arthur Ronald Wiebe (b. September 28, 1912 in Rosthern, Saskatchewan and raised in Vermilion, Alberta - d. June 6, 1971 in Edmonton, Alberta) was a professional ice hockey player who played 414 games in the National Hockey League. He won the Stanley Cup in 1938. He played his entire career with the Chicago Black Hawks.

External links

1912 births
1971 deaths
Canadian ice hockey defencemen
Chicago Blackhawks players
Ice hockey people from Alberta
Stanley Cup champions